Chuckie Nguyen (January 21, 1986), better known by his stage name of C-A, and formerly as Chuckie Akenz, is a Canadian rapper of Vietnamese descent. He grew up in the Jane and Finch neighbourhood of Toronto, Ontario, Canada. Chuckie rose to notoriety with the filming of an amateur rap video called "You Got Beef?" The music video was widely viewed on the internet, being both praised and criticized.
He is considered one of the first well known Asian hip-hop artists around the world.
Chuckie was featured on two national documentaries talking about his life and how it was growing up as an Asian youth in urban Toronto. Chuckie at this time also had 3 music videos rotated on Much Music as well as several media features.
After leaving the music business officially in 2009, Chuckie began pursuing other avenues in his life.

Biography
The son of Vietnamese refugees, Chuckie grew up in the Jane and Finch neighbourhood of Toronto. He grew up with his mother, and his father was not present in his childhood after his parents split at an early age.
Chuckie found music in his teenage years as an outlet to express his upbringings in the Jane and Finch community. His music expressed a lot of what teenage youth in the area went through during the time and despite the sometimes negative view, it always had a positive message behind it. As of today Chuckie is a current serving member of the Canadian Armed Forces.

Discography

2009 Chuckie A: From The Beginning
2009 Chuckie A: Before I Begin
2004 21 Clipz: In The Guns We Trust
2003 Chuckie Akenz: Twenty One Clipz
2002 Chuckie Akenz: The Return To Fame
2001 2TRIPLE9 Presents: Street Spitterz

Singles
2014 Yesterday
2013 I Remember.
2011 Tonight.
2010 Never Stop.
2010 When It Rains
2010 Everywhere You Go
2010 Reality
2009 For My People
2009 Who You Are
2009 Okay
2009 Friends Till We Die
2009 Like A Love Song
2008 Annie
2008 Chasing My Dreams
2008 Fresh Air
2008 Time And Time Again
2007 Angels/From The Beginning
2007 Uptown/We Cry
2007 Music is my Life
2006 Going Away
2005 That's the Way it Goes
2005 This is My Life
2005 When I'm Gone
2005 Just a Dream
2005 Those Days ft Buck
2005 To The Top
2005 Toy Soldiers Remix
2005 Real Homiez ft Burnz, and Buck
2005 My Heart
2005 Love Hurts
2005 I'm Sorry
2004 Soldier
2004 You Got Beef?
2002 Don't Worry

Music videos
2011 Reality
2008 Love Hurts (Feat. Christopher Charles)
2007 Angels/From The Beginning
2007 Uptown/We Cry
2007 Music is my Life
2006 Going Away
2005 What's Life?
2005 That's the Way it Goes
2005 This is My Life
2005 When I'm Gone
2005 Just a Dream
2005 Those Days
2005 Toy Soldiers Remix
2005 Real Homiez
2005 My Heart
2005 Love Hurts
2005 I'm Sorry
2004 Soldier
2004 You Got Beef?
2002 Don't Worry

References

External links
Interview of Chuckie Akenz
Chuckie Akenz Official site
Chuckie Akenz' MySpace

1986 births
Living people
Vietnamese emigrants to Canada
Canadian male singer-songwriters
Canadian singer-songwriters
Canadian male rappers
Canadian musicians of Vietnamese descent
Rappers from Toronto
21st-century Canadian male musicians
21st-century Canadian rappers